Huang Xu (born February 4, 1979) is a Chinese artistic gymnast. He specializes on the pommel horse and the parallel bars and is also strong on still rings.

Background
Huang began gymnastics training when he was five and was a member of the Jiangxu provincial team in 1989. At the age of 14, he was selected into the national team.

National team

Huang represented China at the 2000 Summer Olympics and was a member of the gold-medal-winning Chinese team. Individually, he placed 7th in the parallel bars event final, with a score of 9.650.

During the 2004 Summer Olympics, Huang contributed heavily to the Chinese gymnastics team, a 9.675 on pommel horse, a 9.712 on still rings and a 9.687 on horizontal bar. However, several errors and falls of his teammates prevented the Chinese team from getting a team medal. Individually, he placed fourth in the pommel horse event final, with a score of 9.775.

Huang was the oldest member of the Chinese gymnastics team at the 2008 Summer Olympics and won gold in the team final. He also placed sixth in the parallel bars event final.

Huang is the 2003 World silver medalist on the parallel bars, and has been a member of four World Champion Chinese teams (1997, 1999, 2003, 2007).

References

External links
 
 
 
 
 
 

1979 births
Living people
Chinese male artistic gymnasts
Gymnasts at the 2000 Summer Olympics
Gymnasts at the 2004 Summer Olympics
Gymnasts at the 2008 Summer Olympics
Medalists at the World Artistic Gymnastics Championships
Olympic gold medalists for China
Olympic gymnasts of China
Sportspeople from Nantong
Olympic medalists in gymnastics
Gymnasts from Jiangsu
Medalists at the 2008 Summer Olympics
Asian Games medalists in gymnastics
Gymnasts at the 1998 Asian Games
Gymnasts at the 2002 Asian Games
Medalists at the 1998 Asian Games
Medalists at the 2002 Asian Games
Medalists at the 2000 Summer Olympics
Asian Games gold medalists for China
Asian Games silver medalists for China
Asian Games bronze medalists for China
Nanjing Sport Institute alumni
21st-century Chinese people